Para Toda Vida is the second album by The New Amsterdams recorded in 2001 and released on January 22, 2002 on Vagrant Records and Heroes & Villains Records.

Background 
It was recorded at Z'gwonth Studios, Lawrence Kansas nearly at the same period as the Get Up Kids-Album On a Wire, but it was realised a few months earlier. The Song "Foever Leaving" was originally performed by "The Tijuana Crime Scene" from Kansas, the origin Band of the album-producer Alex Brahl. "All Ears" is a Cover of the indie/alternative rock band "Kill Creek" from Lawrence, Kansas.

Track listing

Reception 
" If one enjoys the Get Up Kids, and especially those songs of theirs when they are mellower and/or acoustic, then this will truly be a delight. Fans of the first album will probably like this one, although much of the punch seems to be missing that was associated with the full-band sound of the debut. Not horribly deficient, yet not as powerful as it has the potential to be." - Allmusic

"...No, nothing against Pryor and his songs, somehow they are beautiful and nice and sometimes heartrendingly beautiful, but the real need to release this record and especially to own it [cannot be seen]." - Ox-Fanzine

"...[Pryor is] expecting that poignancy and emotional depth to spontaneously result from stripped-down instrumentation." - Pitchfork

Personnel 

 Matt Pryor - Performer, Producer
 Alex Brahl - Producer, Engineer
 Kendra Herring - Painting [Cover]
 Joby J Ford - Design
 Andrew Ellis - Booking

Charts

References

2002 albums
The New Amsterdams albums
Vagrant Records albums